Roseomonas aerofrigidensis is a species of Gram negative, strictly aerobic, coccobacilli-shaped, pink-colored bacterium. The bacteria was isolated first isolated from a laboratory air-conditioning system in South Korea, and the new species name was proposed in 2017. Another species of Roseomonas, R. aeriglobus, was also isolated from an air conditioner.

The optimum growth temperature for R. aerofrigidensis is 30 °C, but can grow in the 10-45 °C range. The optimum pH is 7.0, and can grow in pH 4.5-9.5.

References

External links
Type strain of Roseomonas aerofrigidensis at BacDive -  the Bacterial Diversity Metadatabase

Rhodospirillales
Bacteria described in 2017